The Polynesian Championships in athletics records are the best marks set by athletes who are representing one of the member states of the Polynesian Championships Council during the correspondent athletics event which began in 2000.

Men
Key:

Women
Key:

Mixed

References

Polynesian Championships in Athletics
Polynesian Championships